Aghanashanamore is a townland in the civil parish of Ballyloughloe in County Westmeath, Ireland.

The townland is to the east of Athlone, the village and townland of Mount Temple borders the townland.

References 

Townlands of County Westmeath